The Zenair Tri-Z CH 300 is a three-seat Canadian homebuilt light aircraft.  A single-engined low-winged monoplane, the CH 300 first flew in 1977, with several hundred kits sold.

Development and design

The CH 300 is an enlarged three-seat derivative of the Zenair Zenith CH 200, designed by Chris Heintz in the mid 1970s as the Tri-Zénith. Like the CH 200, it is a low-winged monoplane of all-metal construction with a fixed nosewheel undercarriage, but is larger and more powerful, and is fitted with a rear bench seat capable of accommodating a third adult or two children, and is fitted with a forward sliding canopy.  It is designed to be powered by an engine giving between 125 and 180 hp (93 and 134 kW).

The first example made its maiden flight on 9 July 1977, with over 400 sets of plans sold by 1982. One CH 300, modified with extra fuel tanks and piloted by Robin "Red" Morris, made a non-stop trans-Canada flight between Vancouver International Airport and Halifax International Airport on 1–2 July 1978, covering the 2,759 mile (4,440 km) in 22 hours, 44 mins, setting three FAI Class C-1c point-to-point speed records.

Plans for the CH 300 remained on sale in 1999. The Zenair CH 300 formed the basis for the factory built Zenair CH-2000, which first flew in 1993.

Variants
CH 300
Basic model with tricycle landing gear
CH 300 TD
"Taildragger" model with conventional landing gear

Aircraft on display
Canada Aviation and Space Museum

Specifications (150 hp O-320 engine)

See also

Notes

References

Taylor, John W. R. Jane's All The World's Aircraft 1976-77. London:Jane's Yearbooks, 1976. .
Taylor, John W. R. Jane's All The World's Aircraft 1982-83. London:Jane's Yearbooks, 1982. .
Taylor, Michael J. H. Brassey's World Aircraft & Systems Directory 1999/2000. London:Brassey's, 1999. . 

1970s Canadian sport aircraft
Homebuilt aircraft
CH 300
Single-engined tractor aircraft
Low-wing aircraft
Aircraft first flown in 1977